Juma Sultan (born April 13, 1942) is a jazz musician, most often recording as a percussionist or bass player. He may be best known for his appearance at the Woodstock festival of 1969 at Bethel, New York, playing with Jimi Hendrix. He currently plays in the African performance group Sankofa, the band Sons of Thunder, and with the Juma Sultan Band.

Career 
Sultan was born in Monrovia, California on April 13, 1942. In 1969, he performed at the Woodstock festival in Hendrix's band, Gypsy Sun and Rainbows and on The Dick Cavett Show and at a special show in Harlem, New York several weeks later. He was interviewed extensively for the documentary films, Jimi Hendrix and Jimi Hendrix: Live at Woodstock. He appears on approximately 12 of Jimi Hendrix' posthumous releases.

Juma Sultan's musical talents span jazz, rock, blues and spirituals throughout decades of performing, producing and recording.  
In 2006, Clarkson University, in conjunction with Sultan, received a grant from the National Endowment of the Arts to preserve Sultan's audio and video documentation of avant garde jazz during the 1960s and 1970s.  The collection may be viewed at www.jumasarchive.org.

Sultan appeared at the National Rock Con from July 30, 2010 – August 1, 2010.

Sultan also joined Vince Martell, Spanky and Our Gang, and Bleu Ocean at B.B. King's Blues Club on August 2, 2010, for the encore of "California Dreamin'".

Juma also recorded with Archie Shepp, Noah Howard,  Kalaparusha Maurice McIntyre, Sonny Simmons, Daoud Haroon, Asha Nan, Emmeretta Marks, Don Moore Band, and Sankofa.

A conga player listed as Juma Santos is credited on Miles Davis's Bitches Brew. He toured and recorded with Miles Davis, Nina Simone, David Sanborn and Taj Mahal, among others. Juma Santos was an entirely different individual, and not the same person who is the subject of this article.

Discography

As leader or co-leader
With Juma Sultan's Aboriginal Music Society
 Father of Origin (Eremite, 2011)
 Whispers from the Archive (Porter, 2012)

As sideman

With Sam Amidon
 The Following Mountain (Nonesuch, 2017)

With the Earl Cross Sextet
 Jazz of the Seventies: Sam Rivers Tuba Trio & Earl Cross Sextet (Circle, 1977)

With Alan Glover
 The Juice Quartet Archives Volumes 1, 2, 3 (Omolade, 2010)

With Jimi Hendrix
 The Cry of Love (Reprise, 1971)
 Rainbow Bridge (Reprise, 1971)
 Soundtrack Recordings from the Film Jimi Hendrix (Reprise, 1973)
 Crash Landing (Reprise, 1975)
 Woodstock (MCA, 1994)
 Voodoo Soup (MCA, 1995)
 First Rays of the New Rising Sun (MCA, 1997)
 South Saturn Delta (MCA, 1997)
 Live at Woodstock (MCA, 1999; deluxe edition 2010)
 The Jimi Hendrix Experience (MCA, 2000)
 Valleys of Neptune (Legacy, 2010)
 West Coast Seattle Boy: The Jimi Hendrix Anthology (Legacy, 2010)
 People, Hell and Angels (Legacy, 2013)

With Noah Howard
 The Black Ark (Freedom, 1972)
 Live at the Village Vanguard (Freedom, 1975)

With Kalaparusha Maurice McIntyre
 Kwanza (Baystate, 1978)

With Joe McPhee, Michael Bisio, and Fredrick Lonberg-Holm
 The Sweet Spot (RogueArt, 2021)

With Archie Shepp
 Things Have Got to Change (Impulse!, 1971)
 Attica Blues (Impulse!, 1972)

With Sonny Simmons
 Manhattan Egos (Arhoolie, 1969)

Selected filmography/videography 
 Jimi Hendrix: The Dick Cavett Show (1969)
 Woodstock (1970)
 Jimi Hendrix at Woodstock (1992)
 Jimi Hendrix: Live at Woodstock (1999)
 Biography - Jimi Hendrix: The Man They Made God (2000)
 Jimi Hendrix : Blues (Deluxe Version) (2010)
 Biography - Jimi Hendrix: Voodoo Child (2010)

References

External links 
 Juma's Archive
 
 

 Finding aid to the Juma Sultan archive at Columbia University. Rare Book & Manuscript Library.

 

1942 births
African-American musicians
American percussionists
Living people
People from Monrovia, California
Gypsy Sun and Rainbows members
21st-century African-American people
20th-century African-American people